The Joplin Tundra is a family of Canadian, high-wing, strut-braced, pusher configuration ultralight aircraft that was originally produced by Back Forty Developments of Campbellford, Ontario, Canada and later by Joplin Light Aircraft of Joplin, Missouri and Laron Aviation of Borger, Texas for amateur construction. The aircraft is out of production.

Design and development
The initial model of the Tundra family was the two-seats-in-tandem tricycle gear Tundra for the US ultralight trainer, homebuilt and European FAI microlight categories. The aircraft features a semi-enclosed cockpit with optional doors and can be fitted with skis or floats.

The Tundra is built from a welded steel cockpit cage with a fibreglass fairing. The tailboom, tail group and wings are of aluminium construction, with the wings and tail surfaces covered in doped aircraft fabric. The wing incorporates a D-cell, Junkers-style ailerons and a single strut layout.

The standard engine is the  Rotax 503 twin-cylinder, two-stroke aircraft engine, with the liquid-cooled  Rotax 618,  Rotax 582,  Hirth 2706 or the  SuziAir three-cylinder engines optional. Reported construction time for the two-seater is 250 hours.

The two-seater Tundra was later developed into a conventional landing gear single-seat ultralight for the US FAR 103 Ultralight Vehicles category, including meeting the category's stringent  empty weight limit. The resulting aircraft was introduced in 1997 and was designated the 1/2 Tun indicating it was "half a Tundra". The cockpit steel tube structure was also reduced, along with the cockpit fairing and the fuel tank was changed to  capacity, from the two-seater's  tank. Reported construction time for the 1/2 Tun is also 250 hours. The 1/2 Tun's standard engine is the  Rotax 447 twin-cylinder, two-stroke aircraft engine.

Variants

Tundra
Two-seat model with tricycle landing gear and a  wingspan. Fifteen were reported flying in 1998.
1/2 Tun
Single-seat model with conventional landing gear and a  wingspan.

Specifications (1/2 Tun)

See also

References

External links

1990s Canadian ultralight aircraft